Filibuvir (also known as PF-00868554, PF-868554) was a non-nucleoside orally available NS5B inhibitor developed by Pfizer for the treatment of hepatitis C. It binds to the non-catalytic Thumb II allosteric pocket of NS5B viral polymerase and causes a decrease in viral RNA synthesis. It is a potent and selective inhibitor, with a mean IC50 of 0.019 μM against genotype 1 polymerases. Several filibuvir-resistant mutations have been identified, M423 being the most common that occurred after filibuvir monotherapy. It was intended to be taken twice-daily.

Its investigation was discontinued in February 2013 due to strategic reasons.

References 

Abandoned drugs
NS5B (polymerase) inhibitors
Lactones
Triazoles
Pyridines
Pyrimidines
Cyclopentanes